The Men's 100 metres event at the 2013 European Athletics U23 Championships was held in Tampere, Finland, at Ratina Stadium on 11 and 12 July.

Medalists

Results

Final

12 July 2013 / 18:10
Wind: -0.3 m/s

Semifinals
Qualified: First 3 in each heat (Q) and 2 best performers (q) advance to the Final

Summary

Details

Semifinal 1
11 July 2013 / 18:30
Wind: -0.5 m/s

Semifinal 2
11 July 2013 / 18:37
Wind: -1.1 m/s

Heats
Qualified: First 3 in each heat (Q) and 4 best performers (q) advance to the Semifinals

Summary

Details

Heat 1
11 July 2013 / 10:50
Wind: -1.3 m/s

Heat 2
11 July 2013 / 10:58
Wind: -1.3 m/s

Heat 3
11 July 2013 / 11:06
Wind: -0.2 m/s

Heat 4
11 July 2013 / 11:14
Wind: -0.9 m/s

Participation
According to an unofficial count, 32 athletes from 21 countries participated in the event.

References

100 metres
100 metres at the European Athletics U23 Championships